All Saints’ Church, Aston upon Trent is a Grade I listed parish church in the Church of England in Aston-on-Trent, Derbyshire.

History
The church dates from the 12th century, with elements from the 13th, 14th, 15th and 16th century It was restored in 1853 and again in 1873.

Parish status
The church is in a joint parish with 
St Wilfrid's Church, Barrow-upon-Trent
St Andrew’s Church, Twyford
St Bartholomew’s Church, Elvaston
St James Church, Shardlow 
St James’ Church, Swarkestone
St Mary the Virgin’s Church, Weston-on-Trent

Organ
The first pipe organ by Joseph Walker dating from 1816 was moved to St Mary the Virgin’s Church, Weston-on-Trent in 1974. The church currently contains a pipe organ by Bates which was installed in Holy Trinity Church, Derby around 1850, and moved to All Saints in 1974. A specification of the organ can be found on the National Pipe Organ Register.

See also
Grade I listed churches in Derbyshire
Listed buildings in Aston-on-Trent

References

Church of England church buildings in Derbyshire
Grade I listed churches in Derbyshire